Gerhard Schrader (25 February 1903 – 10 April 1990) was a German chemist specializing in the discovery of new insecticides, hoping to make progress in the fight against hunger in the world. Schrader is best known for his accidental discovery of nerve agents such as sarin and tabun, and for this he is sometimes called the "father of the nerve agents".

Schrader was born in Bortfeld, near Wendeburg, Germany. He attended gymnasium in Braunschweig and later studied chemistry at Braunschweig University of Technology. He was later employed at the Bayer AG division of IG Farben.

Schrader discovered several very effective insecticides, including bladan (the first fully synthetic contact insecticide Hexaethyl tetraphosphate being a constituent), and parathion (E 605). In 1936, while employed by the large German conglomerate IG Farben, he was experimenting with a class of compounds called organophosphates, which killed insects by interrupting their nervous systems. Instead of a new insecticide, he accidentally discovered tabun, an enormously toxic organophosphate compound and nerve agent. During World War II, under the Nazi regime, teams led by Schrader discovered two more organophosphate nerve agents, and a fourth after the war:

 Tabun (1936)
 Sarin (1938)
 Soman (1944)
 Cyclosarin (1949)

References

20th-century German chemists
Chemical warfare
People from Peine (district)
Scientists from Braunschweig
Technical University of Braunschweig alumni
1903 births
1990 deaths